Sadhu Meher (born in Odisha, India) is an Indian actor, director, and producer.

He has performed in both Odia and Hindi films. He primarily began his career in Hindi films such as Bhuvan Shome, Ankur and Mrigaya. Later on shifted his interest towards Odia films. He is one of the actors who gained prominence in Parallel Cinema in the mid-1980s. 
He also acted in Byomkesh Bakshi in the episodes "Aadim Shatru (Part 1 & 2)" and "Chakrant" as Anadi Haldar and Bishupal respectively.
He won a National Film Award for Best Actor for Ankur.
He was conferred Padma Sri by the Government of India in 2017.

Filmography

Sadhu Meher also played characters, Anadi Haldar, in the episode "Aadim Shatru (Part 1 & 2)", and Bishupal, in the episode "Chakrant", of Byomkesh Bakshi, broadcast by Doordarshan in 1997.

References

External links
 

Living people
Film directors from Odisha
Male actors from Odisha
Best Actor National Film Award winners
Indian male film actors
Male actors in Hindi cinema
Male actors in Odia cinema
Odia film directors
20th-century Indian male actors
21st-century Indian male actors
Recipients of the Padma Shri in arts
20th-century Indian film directors
Film producers from Odisha
Year of birth missing (living people)